Nus is a town and comune in the Aosta Valley region of northern Italy.

See also
Vien de Nus, Italian wine grape that is a specialty of the region.

References

Cities and towns in Aosta Valley